Pyari Mona is a Pakistani television series directed by Ali Hasan. It features Sanam Jung in the titular role along with Adeel Hussain, Sabeeka Imam, Mashal Khan and Adnan Jaffar in prominent roles. It first aired on Hum TV from 19 January 2022. It focuses on the subject of body shaming and revolves around the struggle of an overweight girl.

Plot 

After moving from Karachi to Lahore, Mona does a number of jobs and now looks for another after quitting the previous one, despite hailing from an affluent family. She wants to do job for her passion but her mother doesn't like it and wants her to marry with a suitable guy. His father however supports her decision.

Cast 

 Sanam Jung as Mona Khalid
 Hunbal Khan as Irfan
 Adeel Hussain as Babar
 Sabeeka Imam as Samia 
 Mashal Khan as Zee
 Uzma Beg as Shaista
 Adnan Jaffar as Khalid
 Salma Asim as Lubna
 Shaheen Khan as Irfan's mother

Reception 

The first teaser was released on Hum Tv’s official pages and was met with positive reviews for its unconventional storyline and relatable character portrayal. Although initial teasers were positive the drama later garnered criticism due to the casting of Sanam Jung, who is not plus size and wore a fatsuit to don the character. Jung later gave a statement explaining as to why she wore the fat suit and clarified that she did in fact gain weight to fit the role but was restricted to 5-7kgs due to health conditions.

References 

2023 Pakistani television series debuts